(born 1967) He is a full professor at Keio University. He earned a Ph.D. in Social Anthropology at Harvard University in 1997 with a dissertation on "Nurturing A Context: The Logic of Individualism and the Negotiation of the Familial Sphere in the United States."  After post-doctoral fellowships at Cambridge and Oxford Universities, he joined Keio University's Graduate School of Media and Governance as well as Faculty of Environment and Information Studies in 1999.  He attained the rank of full professor in 2005, and is one of Japan's most prominent experts on cultural policy, public diplomacy, and American Studies.

During the 2003–04 academic years, he was a recipient of an Abe Fellowship, which he held at the Weatherhead Center for International Affairs at Harvard University.  He was awarded a prestigious Japan Academy Medal in 2005.  He served as a Fellow at Downing College, Cambridge in 2007, a visiting professor at Institut d'Etudes Politiques de Paris (Science-Po) in 2013 and a Japan Scholar at the Wilson Center in 2018.  He was a visiting scholar at the School of International Studies at Peking University in 2017 and at College of Europe in 2018.

He has served on the executive board of the Japanese Association for American Studies, the Advisory Panel on Public Diplomacy of the Japanese Ministry of Foreign Affairs, and the Advisory Panel (Chairperson) on NHK World.  He has also served as an editorial member of Gaiko (Diplomacy) magazine, a book reviewer for Asahi Shimbun and Yomiuri Shimbun, a member of the board of directors (program director) at the International House of Japan, and a co-chair of the Japan Advisory Council of the Salzburg Global Seminar, among many others.  He is a member of Harvard Club of Japan. He serves on the editorial boards of Anthem Studies in Soft Power and Public Diplomacy andPlace Branding and Public Diplomacy. He has been selected to the International Visitor Leadership Program (IVLP) by the U.S. Department of State in 2018.

Works

In English
The American Family: Across the Class Divide London ; Ann Arbor, MI : University of Michigan Press; London, U.K.: Pluto Press, 2005 According to WorldCat, the book is held in 488 libraries
Soft Power Superpowers: Cultural and National Assets of Japan and the United states Armonk, N.Y. : M.E. Sharpe, 2008, Co-editor According to WorldCat, the book is held in 658 libraries
Handbook of Cultural Security, Cheltenham, U.K. : Edward Elgar Publishing, 2018, Editor

In Japanese (single-authored books)
 After America: Trajectories of the Bostonians and the Politics of Culture (2004)
American Community: Between the State and the Individual (2007)
American Center: International Cultural Strategies of the United States (2008) 
Paradox of American Democracy (2010) 
Culture and Diplomacy: The Age of Public Diplomacy (2011) 
American Dilemmas (2015) 
American Legacy: The Spread of Soft Power and Its Implications (2015) 
Rethinking "Culture": On the Concept of Cultural Security (2015)
Libertarianism: The Quest for Freedom in the Contemporary United States  (2019)

References

External links
 Faculty profiles - Yasushi Watanabe

Japanese anthropologists
Harvard Graduate School of Arts and Sciences alumni
Living people
Academic staff of Keio University
1967 births